Big Request Concert is a 1960 Austrian family film directed by Arthur Maria Rabenalt. It was entered into the 2nd Moscow International Film Festival.

Cast

References

External links

1960 films
1960 drama films
Austrian drama films
Austrian black-and-white films